Murighiol (Independența from 1983 to 1996) is a commune in Tulcea County, Northern Dobruja, Romania. It is composed of seven villаges:
 Murighiol
 Plopul (formerly Beibudzac)
 Colina
 Dunavățu de Jos
 Dunavățu de Sus  
 Sarinasuf
 Uzlina

At the 2011 census, 94.6% of the inhabitants were Romanians, 4.5% Ukrainians and 0.4% Turks. 

The commune's name is of Turkish origin: moru ("violet") and göl ("lake") compounded to mean "violet lake".

The archaeological site of Halmyris is located near the village of Murighiol. Halmyris was a Roman legionary fort from the 1st–4th centuries CE.  It is currently under excavation.

References

External links

Communes in Tulcea County
Localities in Northern Dobruja
Place names of Turkish origin in Romania